Nicolaas de Wolf (October 27, 1887 in Apeldoorn – July 18, 1967 in Doesburg) was a Dutch amateur football (soccer) player who competed in the 1912 Summer Olympics. He was part of the Dutch team, which won the bronze medal in the football tournament.

References

External links
 
 

1887 births
1967 deaths
Dutch footballers
Footballers at the 1912 Summer Olympics
Olympic footballers of the Netherlands
Olympic bronze medalists for the Netherlands
Netherlands international footballers
Sportspeople from Apeldoorn
Olympic medalists in football
Medalists at the 1912 Summer Olympics
Association football midfielders
Footballers from Gelderland